William Hathaway Forbes (1840–1897) was an American businessman.

Early life
William Hathaway Forbes was born on October 31, 1840 in Milton, Massachusetts. His father, John Murray Forbes, was a French-born railroad magnate.

Forbes enrolled at Harvard University in 1857, but he was expelled in 1860. During the American Civil War of 1861-1865, he served in the 1st Massachusetts Volunteer Cavalry of the Union Army from 1861 to 1863, and in the 2nd Regiment of Cavalry, Massachusetts Volunteers from 1863 to 1865. He was captured by the Confederate States Army on July 6, 1864 and imprisoned in Charleston and Columbia, South Carolina until December 1864. He received a bachelor of arts degree from Harvard University in 1871.

Career
Forbes started his career at J.M. Forbes & Co., an investment firm founded by his father.

In the later 1870s, Forbes was approached by Gardiner Greene Hubbard and Thomas Sanders to invest in their Bell Telephone Company. Not only did Forbes invest, he encouraged some of his wealthy acquaintances to do so too. Subsequently, Forbes served as the President of the Bell Telephone Company from 1879 to 1887.

Personal life
Forbes married Edith Emerson, the daughter of poet Ralph Waldo Emerson. They had six sons, Ralph Emerson Forbes, W. Cameron Forbes, John Murray Forbes (who died at age 17 of appendicitis), Edward W. Forbes, Waldo Emerson Forbes and Alexander Forbes, and two daughters, Edith Forbes and Ellen Randolph Forbes.

Death
Forbes died on October 11, 1897 on Naushon Island, Massachusetts.

Further reading
Pier, Arthur Stanwood. Forbes: Telephone Pioneer (New York: Dodd, Mead, 1953).

References

1840 births
1897 deaths
People from Milton, Massachusetts
People from Dukes County, Massachusetts
Union Army officers
American Civil War prisoners of war
Harvard University alumni
American businesspeople
William Hathaway